Helmut Hallemaa (born 30 June 1954 in Valga) is an Estonian politician. He was a member of XIII Riigikogu.

He has been a member of Estonian Centre Party.

References

Living people
1954 births
Estonian Centre Party politicians
Members of the Riigikogu, 2015–2019
University of Tartu alumni
People from Valga, Estonia